Earthsblood is the fifth studio album by the American heavy metal band God Forbid. It was released in 2009, on February 16 in Europe and February 24 in North America, through Century Media Records. The album was produced by Eric Rachel with Christian Olde Wolbers handling all vocal tracking. The mixing was by Jens Bogren, and the artwork was by Gustavo Sazes. This is the last God Forbid album with rhythm guitarist Dallas Coyle. The song "Empire of the Gun" is a downloadable track for the video game Rock Band.

The album sold around 5,400 copies in its first week of release to reach No. 110 on The Billboard 200 chart.

Track listing

Personnel
 Byron Davis – lead vocals
 Doc Coyle – lead guitar, backing vocals
 Dallas Coyle – rhythm guitar, clean vocals
 John "Beeker" Outcalt – bass guitar
 Corey Pierce – drums
 Michael Pinnella – keyboards on tracks 8 and 9
 Michael Romeo – orchestra on tracks 1 and 10

References

2009 albums
God Forbid albums
Century Media Records albums